Wang Laichun (born 1966/1967) is a Chinese billionaire, chairwoman, and co-founder of the electronics manufacturer Luxshare Precision Industry Co.,Ltd, better known as Luxshare-ICT. Founded in 2004 in Dongguan, China, the company designs and manufacturers computer cables; it is also a key assembler of AirPods for Apple. The company was listed publicly on the SME board of the Shenzhen Stock Exchange in 2010.

In 2014, The Daily Telegraph announced that, at the age of 46, she was one of the world's youngest self-made women billionaires.

Wang previously worked ten years for Foxconn, before founding Luxshare Precision Industry Co.,Ltd  with her brother, Wang Laishen, who serves as the company's vice chairman.

In 2021, she was the second-richest woman in China according to China Daily.

References

Living people
Chinese billionaires
Chinese business executives
Chinese women business executives
Year of birth missing (living people)
Female billionaires
Chinese technology company founders
1960s births
Foxconn people